Robert Ludlum (May 25, 1927 – March 12, 2001) was an American author of 27 thriller novels, best known as the creator of Jason Bourne from the original The Bourne Trilogy series. The number of copies of his books in print is estimated between 300 million and 500 million. They have been published in 33 languages and 40 countries. Ludlum also published books under the pseudonyms Jonathan Ryder and Michael Shepherd.

Life and career

Early life and education
Ludlum was born in New York City, the son of Margaret (née Wadsworth) and George Hartford Ludlum. He was educated at the Rectory School then Cheshire Academy and Wesleyan University in Middletown, Connecticut, where he earned a B.A. in Drama in 1951.

Career
Prior to becoming an author, he had been a United States Marine, a theatrical actor and producer. In the 1950s, he produced shows at the Grant Lee theater in Fort Lee, New Jersey. From 1960 to 1970, he managed and produced shows at the Playhouse on the Mall at Bergen Mall in Paramus, New Jersey. His theatrical experience may have contributed to his understanding of the energy, escapism and action that the public wanted in a novel. He once remarked: "I equate suspense and good theater in a very similar way. I think it's all suspense and what-happens-next. From that point of view, yes, I guess, I am theatrical."

Many of Ludlum's novels have been made into films and mini-series, including The Osterman Weekend, The Holcroft Covenant, The Apocalypse Watch, The Bourne Identity, The Bourne Supremacy and The Bourne Ultimatum. Covert One: The Hades Factor, a book co-written with Gayle Lynds, was originally conceived as a mini-series; the book evolved from a short treatment Ludlum wrote for NBC. The Bourne movies, starring Matt Damon in the title role, have been commercially and critically successful (The Bourne Ultimatum won three Academy Awards in 2008), although the story lines depart significantly from the source material.

During the 1970s, Ludlum lived in Leonia, New Jersey, where he spent hours each day writing at his home.

Death
Ludlum died of a heart attack on March 12, 2001, at his home in Naples, Florida, while recovering from severe burns caused by a mysterious fire which occurred on February 10, 2001.

In 2005, the company which held all merchandising for Ludlum's works via the Ludlum's estate, Ludlum Entertainment, inked an agreement with Vivendi Universal Games to handle video game rights to the games for a 10-year agreement. The license expired in 2008. On November 20, 2008, the Ludlum estate inked a deal with Universal Pictures to develop feature films based on the works of Robert Ludlum. On February 2, 2009, Ludlum transferred video game rights to his work to Electronic Arts after Activision took over Vivendi Games' assets.

Writing analysis and criticism
Ludlum's novels typically feature one heroic man, or a small group of crusading individuals, in a struggle against powerful adversaries whose intentions and motivations are evil and who are capable of using political and economic mechanisms in frightening ways. The world in his writings is one where global corporations, shadowy military forces and government organizations all conspired to preserve (if it was evil) or undermine (if it was law-abiding) the status quo.

Ludlum's novels were often inspired by conspiracy theories, both historical and contemporary. He wrote that The Matarese Circle was inspired by rumors about the Trilateral Commission, and it was published only a few years after the commission was founded. His depictions of terrorism in books such as The Holcroft Covenant and The Matarese Circle reflected the theory that terrorists, rather than being merely isolated bands of ideologically or politically motivated extremists, are actually pawns of governments or private organizations who are using them to facilitate the establishment of authoritarian rule.

Bibliography

Filmography
Many of Ludlum's novels have been made into films and miniseries, although the storylines might depart significantly from the source material. In general, a miniseries is more faithful to the original novel on which it is based.  Adaptations of Ludlum's works are published under the trademark Treadstone, which is held by the executor of the Robert Ludlum estate.
1977 – The Rhinemann Exchange — miniseries — Stephen Collins as David Spaulding, Lauren Hutton as Leslie Jenner Hawkewood
1983 – The Osterman Weekend — film — Rutger Hauer as John Tanner, Sam Peckinpah directed
1985 – The Holcroft Covenant — film — Michael Caine as Noel Holcroft 
1988 – The Bourne Identity — miniseries — Richard Chamberlain as Jason Bourne, Jaclyn Smith as Marie St. Jacques
1997 – The Apocalypse Watch — miniseries — Patrick Bergin as Drew Latham
2002 – The Bourne Identity — film — Matt Damon as Jason Bourne and Franka Potente as Marie Helena Kreutz
2004 – The Bourne Supremacy — film — Matt Damon as Jason Bourne
2006 – Covert One: The Hades Factor — miniseries — Stephen Dorff as Jon Smith
2007 – The Bourne Ultimatum — film — Matt Damon as Jason Bourne
2012 – The Bourne Legacy — film — starring Jeremy Renner, Rachel Weisz and Edward Norton
2016 – Jason Bourne — film — Matt Damon as Jason Bourne
TBA – The Chancellor Manuscript — film — Leonardo DiCaprio as Peter Chancellor1
TBA – The Janson Directive — film — John Cena as Paul Janson1

1 announced/in development

See also

 Airport novel
 Publishers Weekly lists of bestselling novels in the United States
 Spy fiction

References

External links

Official Robert Ludlum website
 
Robert Ludlum at the Internet Book List

 
1927 births
2001 deaths
20th-century American novelists
American male novelists
American spy fiction writers
American thriller writers
People from Leonia, New Jersey
United States Marines
Wesleyan University alumni
Writers from New York City
Postmodern writers
Novelists from New York (state)
Cheshire Academy alumni
United States Marine Corps personnel of World War II
20th-century American male writers